The 2010 European Cup, known as the Alitalia European Cup for sponsorship purposes, is a rugby league football tournament. Three of the competing teams participated in the 2009 European Cup, with France also being included in the tournament after competing in the 2009 Four Nations. The winner of the competition, Wales, competed in the 2011 Four Nations tournament.

Squads

France
preliminary squad:
Coach:  Bobbie Goulding

Ireland
30 Man Squad
Coach:  Andy Kelly

Scotland
Preliminary Squad 

Coach:  Steve McCormack

Wales
48 Man Squad:

Coach:  Iestyn Harris

Standings

Pre-tournament matches
Wales announced that they would be playing two friendly warm-up matches against Italy at the Racecourse Ground in Wrexham on 3 and 6 October in preparation for the European Cup. However the first match was cancelled due to a waterlogged pitch, making it a one-off match.

Wales vs Italy

Fixtures

Round 1

Round 2

Teams:

FRANCE: 1. William Barthau, 2. Frédéric Vaccari, 3. Jean-Philippe Baile, 4. Teddy Sadaoui, 5. Cyril Stacul, 6. Tony Gigot, 7. Nicolas Munoz, 8. Mickaël Simon, 9. Kane Bentley, 10. Rémi Casty, 11. Olivier Elima, 12. Julien Touxagas, 13. Jason Baitieri. Subs: 14. Andrew Bentley, 15. Mathieu Griffi, 16. Sébastien Martins, 17. Romaric Bemba.

SCOTLAND: 1 Lee Paterson, 2. Dave Arnot, 3. Joe Wardle, 4. Kevin Henderson, 5. Jon Steel, 6. Brendan Lindsay, 7. Danny Brough, 8. Oliver Wilkes, 9. Ben Fisher, 10, Mitch Stringer, 11. Alex Szostak, 12. Sam Barlow, 13. Dale Ferguson. Subs: 14. Andrew Henderson, 15. Paddy Coupar, 16. Neil Lowe, 17. Jack Howieson.

Round 3

Wales are Champions and will play in the 2011 Four Nations.

References

European Cup
European Nations Cup
European Cup, 2010
European Cup, 2010
European Cup, 2010
European Cup, 2010